Agaponovo is a rural locality (a village) in Smolensky District of Smolensk Oblast, Russia, located  north-west of Smolensk. Population of Agaponovo is 133. Anatoly Ivanovich Mishnev, a Russian politician, is a native of this village.

Location 
This village is located in Smolensk region, district of Smolensk. It is also part of Novocolony. Village is located 14 km of a rail-road station which connects Moscow and Vitebsk. There is a hotel "Borvicha"

History 
Earlier it had had another name – Gaponovo. The Nazi army had occupied it in July 1941. Agaponovo was liberated by The Red Army 26 September 1943.

References 

Rural localities in Smolensk Oblast